Donald C. Allen (1937/1938 – June 16, 2022) was an American amateur golfer. In 2012, he became an inaugural member of the New York State Golf Association Hall of Fame.

Allen grew up near Rochester, New York. In 1965 and 1967 he was selected to the Walker Cup team, and also played on the Americas Cup team in those years. He never won the U.S. Amateur, but won the New York State Amateur six times between 1961 and 1973. He also won two NYSGA Mid-Amateur tournaments and three NYSGA Senior Amateur tournaments. He won the Monroe Invitational four times. He appeared in the Masters Tournament in 1965, 1966, and 1967.

Amateur wins
1955 Monroe Invitational
1957 Monroe Invitational
1959 RDGA District Championship
1961 New York State Amateur, RDGA District Championship
1962 RDGA District Championship
1963 New York State Amateur, RDGA District Championship
1964 New York State Amateur
1965 Monroe Invitational
1966 Monroe Invitational
1970 New York State Amateur
1972 New York State Amateur
1973 New York State Amateur
1974 RDGA District Championship
1978 RDGA District Championship
1985 NYSGA Mid-Amateur
1987 NYSGA Mid-Amateur
1994 NYSGA Men's Senior, RDGA Senior Championship
1996 NYSGA Men's Senior
1997 NYSGA Men's Senior
1999 RDGA Senior Championship

U.S. national team appearances
Amateur
Walker Cup: 1965 (tied, cup retained), 1967 (winners)
Americas Cup: 1965, 1967 (winners)

References

American male golfers
Amateur golfers
Golfers from New York (state)
People from Monroe County, New York
Year of birth missing
1930s births
2022 deaths